Luis Pérez García (born 23 July 1966) is a Spanish racing cyclist. He rode in the 1992 Tour de France.

References

External links
 

1966 births
Living people
Spanish male cyclists
Place of birth missing (living people)
Sportspeople from Salamanca
Cyclists from Castile and León
20th-century Spanish people